Karen Smbatyan (April 21, 1932 in Gyumri - December 27, 2008 in Yerevan) was an Armenian painter.

Life
He was born into an Armenian family in Gyumri. He Studied at Yerevan Fine Art College after Panos Terlemezyan. He has participated in different international exhibitions. His paintings can be found in Armenian National Gallery, "Modern Art" Museum in Washington, "Richard Manukean" Gallery in Detroit, "Arshil Gorki" and "Gallery Drown" in Paris, "Zimerlin" museum of modern arts in New Jersey, and in private collections in various countries. Videos taken from several sources

Abstract
 Throughout his earthly life the diverse and multidimensional artist Karen Smbatyan had to struggle and fight for his internal freedom and external liberty. As a person and citizen, he intrinsically chose the path of veracity and truth. He acted with infinite honesty and stepped through life with pride and honour. The destiny of the Armenian people and his national identity have always been equally dominant and imperative as his quest for the hidden mystery of artistic creativity.

The brief of his biography reveals that the artist was born in 1932 in Gyumri. He studied at P. Terlemezyan College, however later he had to quit his studies to join the Soviet army (Estonia, Doko island). While serving in the army he still continues to work and create and his works tracing back to that period have been highly appreciate within professional circles. His artistic biography dating back to the late 50s and early 60s was characterized by Karen's search for lively, everlasting, authentic perceptions of objects through nature, life and human manifestations, adhering to animated means and forms of high realism ("Makuyk" 1954, "The sailor Nikolay Blokhin", 1954, "Ian Paulianki", 1959, portraits).

During 1966-80 he was the editor Of "Pioner" and "Tsitsarnak" children's periodicals. During that period, he created the illustrations of "Jelsomino in The Land of Cheaters" and "Jan Polat" folktales by Gianni Rodari and authored the images of the periodicals with demonstrating a new fresh approach in the field. Parallel to that he was very sensitive about self-education and paid a special attention to the study and research of the roots of Armenian stylistic school spending hours in the Matenadaran exploring Armenian miniature hardly concealing his admiration and fascination by the genius of art. (Grigor Tatevaci, Toros Taronatsi).

His diary notes dating back to 1970s reveal that he was particularly concerned with his explorations of problems of color and form, their unimpeded interpretation, the free flow of mind and emotions have become direction of art and artistic belief that transmits expressive means and sacred monumental sonority. The insight contemplations open up inner self and metaphysical thinking of the artist for the viewer ("Shell" 1975, "Amulet", 1977, "Indian jug" 1975).

Having sound and deep understanding and perception of the coloristic achievements of Armenian artists (M. Saryan, H. Kalenc, Minas) Karen makes the color surface of the picture so intensive that it turns into fireworks, spiritual soaring, burning sunset. "The Art is feast of colors," he cites the idea of Delacroix which means that it is not the plot that should dominate the picture. This refers to all genres as well as to free compositions ("Varuzhan Vardanyan", 1983 "The portrait of Mshetsi", 1989, "The Garden", 1994, "Autumn", 1999).

This powerful rise of this manifestation of his creativity is an ode to the love for the nature, philanthropy. In the picture the leitmotif is the light, the solar warmth is "the peace of soul". ("The quay. Sevan", 2003, "Noonday", 2005, "Northern sun", 2006).

The simplicity of composition the completeness of the style, the seeming lack of attention for detail have been the most attractive elements of the last two decades, which allowed the artist to achieve monumental sonority. From point of view "The most luxurious luxury is simplicity" or "The painting is complete only when the unnecessary things ara removed".

Quotes
Penetrating and tens, especially by inner clairvoyance characteristic of an individual, he has discovered and reveled-within himself, not from the outside. Other architonic coatings, achieving an apocryphal level where the artist exposes spirited characters and objects, vital in everyone, both indigenous and common to all mankind. Only big artists can see them and show them. On the other hand, the inner world is resuscitated and made viable by the robust power of potential individuality, represented as a whole image due to the brilliance and energy of an artist named Karen Smbatyan, who has acquired the gifts of nature so abundantly.
Ilya Kabakov
Painter, Moscow 1976

International exhibitions
 1974 Bologna, Italy
 1975 Poznan, Poland
 1976 Izmir, Turkey
 1970 Beirut, Lebanon
 1970 Paris, France

Personal exhibitions
 1966 "Komsomolec" newspaper editorial, Yerevan
 1972 Armenian Architects' House, Yerevan
 1979 Painter's House, Yerevan
 1981 Museum of Modern Art, Yerevan
 1981 Vilnius Art Academy
 1987 Exhibition to 80th anniversary of martyrdom of Gevorg Chaush, Talin region, Ashnak village
 1988 Moscow Lazarian Seminary
 1989 "Neringa" Rest House, Palanga
 1994 Writer's House, Yerevan
 1996 Exhibition or foundation "Tatron" /Theatre/, Yerevan
 1997 Heimstetten Art House, Munchen
 1998 Exhibition to Bash-Aparan battle. Aparan,
 1999 "Beshketuryan" Art Gallery, Los Angeles
 2000 Garching Municipal Art Gallery, Munchen
 2001 Exhibition of "Sun MicroSystems Firm", Munchen
 2002 Painter's House, Yerevan
 2004 "Academia" Gallery, Yerevan
 2007 National Art Museum, Yerevan
 2008 Artists' Union of Armenia

Gallery

References

External links

 Official site
 
 Карен Смбатян - Шохакат 2007
 
 
 
 
 
 
 КРАСНЫЙ ЦВЕТ ПОСТОЯНСТВА

1932 births
2008 deaths
20th-century Armenian painters
Armenian portrait painters
Soviet painters
People from Gyumri